Elks Temple or Elks Temple Building may refer to:

Elks Temple (Boise, Idaho)
Elks Temple Building, Cadillac, Michigan
Elks Temple (Portland, Oregon)
Elks Temple (Tacoma, Washington)
Elks Temple (Valparaiso, Indiana)

See also
List of Elks buildings
Elks (disambiguation)